Qal'eh gorikhteh  (meaning "fled castle") is one of the Zagros Mountains, which are 6 km northwest of the town of Sarvestan, in the Fars province.
It derives its name from its unique shape and from how it is falling apart from the main string of mountains.

See also
 List of mountains in Iran
 List of volcanoes in Iran
 Lists of volcanoes
 Volcanic Seven Summits
 List of Ultras of West Asia
 List of peaks by prominence

References

External links
 Geographical Names

Sarvestan
Mountains of Iran
Mountains of Fars Province